Fumaria bicolor is a species of plant in the family Papaveraceae.

Sources

References 

bicolor
Flora of Malta